JAT Yugoslav Airlines Flight 367 was a McDonnell Douglas DC-9-32 aircraft (registration YU-AHT) which exploded shortly after overflying NDB Hermsdorf (located in or around Hinterhermsdorf, in the present-day municipality of Sebnitz), East Germany, while en route from Stockholm to Belgrade on 26 January 1972. The aircraft, piloted by captain Ludvik Razdrih and first officer Ratko Mihić, broke into three pieces and spun out of control, crashing near the village of Srbská Kamenice in Czechoslovakia (now the Czech Republic). Of the 28 on board, 27 were killed upon ground impact and one Yugoslav crew member, Vesna Vulović (1950–2016), survived.

Cause 
The secondary crew of JAT Flight 367, flying from Stockholm to Belgrade with stopovers in Copenhagen and Zagreb, arrived in Denmark on the morning of 25 January 1972. Flight 367 departed from Stockholm Arlanda Airport at 1:30 p.m. on 26 January. The aircraft, a McDonnell Douglas DC-9-32, landed at Copenhagen Airport at 2:30 p.m., where it was taken over by Vulović and her colleagues. "As it was late, we were in the terminal and saw it park," Vulović said. "I saw all the passengers and crew deplane. One man seemed terribly annoyed. It was not only me that noticed him either. Other crew members saw him, as did the station manager in Copenhagen. I think it was the man who put the bomb in the baggage. I think he had checked in a bag in Stockholm, got off in Copenhagen and never re-boarded the flight."

Flight 367 departed from Copenhagen Airport at 3:15 p.m. At 4:01 p.m., an explosion tore through the DC-9's baggage compartment. The explosion caused the aircraft to break apart over the Czechoslovak village of Srbská Kamenice. Vulović was the only survivor of the 28 passengers and crew. Some reports stated Vulović was at the rear of the aircraft when the explosion occurred, but she has stated she was told that she was found in the middle section of the plane. She was discovered by villager Bruno Honke, who heard her screaming amid the wreckage. Her turquoise uniform was covered in blood and her  stiletto heels had been torn off by the force of the impact.  Honke had been a medic during World War II and was able to keep Vulović alive until rescuers arrived. Vulović was in a coma for 27 days and was temporarily paralyzed from the waist down, but survived. She continued working for JAT, holding a desk job.

Between 1962 and 1982, Croatian nationalist groups carried out 128 terror attacks against Yugoslavian civilian and military targets. The Yugoslav authorities suspected that émigré Croatian terrorists (Ustashe) were to blame for bringing down Flight 367. The day of the crash, a bomb exploded aboard a train travelling from Vienna to Zagreb, injuring six. A man, describing himself as a Croatian nationalist, called the Swedish newspaper Kvällsposten the following day and claimed responsibility for the bombing of Flight 367. No arrests have yet been made. The Czechoslovak Civil Aviation Authority later attributed the explosion to a briefcase bomb.

Shootdown conspiracy theory
The officially stated cause of the Flight 367 crash was challenged occasionally over the years by conspiracy theories. For example, in 1997 the Czech periodical Letectví a kosmonautika reported that the plane was shot down by mistake by Czechoslovak air defenses.

The discussion about different aspects of the crash was reopened on 8 January 2009, when German news magazine Tagesschau featured a report by investigative journalists Peter Hornung and Pavel Theiner. Allegedly based on newly obtained documents mainly from the Czech Civil Aviation Authority, they concluded that it was "extremely likely" that the plane had been mistakenly shot down only a few hundred meters above the ground by a MiG fighter of the Czechoslovak Air Force, having been mistaken for an enemy aircraft while attempting a forced landing. All the evidence suggesting that the plane was destroyed at high altitude by explosives placed in a suitcase would be therefore have been forged by Czechoslovak secret police.

As evidence that the DC-9 had broken up at a lower altitude, the journalists cited eyewitnesses from Srbská Kamenice, who had seen the plane burning but still intact below the low-hanging clouds, and confirmation of a Serbian aviation expert (who had been present at the crash site) that the debris area had been much too small for a crash from high altitude; it also referred to sightings of a second plane. According to Hornung, Flight 367 got into difficulties, "went into a steep descent and found itself over a sensitive military area", close to a nuclear weapons facility. However, Hornung himself stated that for his theory "there are only indications, no evidence".

Skepticism
Vulović (who had no memory of the crash or the flight after boarding) referred to the claims that the plane attempted a forced landing or descended to such a low altitude as "nebulous nonsense". A representative of Guinness World Records, according to the German paper Die Tageszeitung, stated that "it seems that at the time Guinness was duped by this swindle just like the rest of the media."

The Civilian Aviation Authority dismissed the conspiracy theory as media speculation, that appears from time to time. Its spokeswoman added that Authority experts would not comment on them and that findings of the official investigation are being questioned mostly because of the media attractiveness of the story.

The Czech magazine Technet quoted a Czech army expert: "In case of violation of the air space, the incident would not be solved by anti-air missiles, but by fighter planes. Also it would not be possible to conceal such incident, as there would be approximately 150–200 people knowing about the incident. They would not have any reason to not tell about the incident today." A potential missile launch would be audible and especially visible for thousands of people long afterwards. He further claims that for the Yugoslav plane, it was technically impossible to dive in a "state of emergency" from the proven flight level to the low altitude and place where it was allegedly shot down. He also states that the debris area wasn't "too small" but that the main parts were more than 1.5 km apart. Additionally, the Czechoslovak Air Defense soldier who operated the radar on the day of the crash stated in a 2009 interview that any Czechoslovak jet fighters would be noticed by West German air defense.

The main evidence against such a theory is the flight data obtained from the black box, which provided the exact data about the time, speed, direction, acceleration and altitude of the plane at the moment of the explosion. Both black boxes were opened and analysed by their respective service companies in Amsterdam in the presence of experts from Czechoslovakia, Yugoslavia, and the Netherlands.

Vulović's fall was the subject of a MythBusters episode, which concluded it was possible to survive the fall depending on how the wreckage someone was sitting in landed.

Vesna Vulović 

Vulović holds the official record in the Guinness Book of Records for the highest fall survived without a parachute. Vulović received the Guinness prize from Paul McCartney.

A major celebrity in Yugoslavia, Vulović was a frequent guest on national television shows such as Maksovizija by Milovan Ilić Minimaks up until the 1990s. She attended annual commemorations at the crash site, until they were stopped in 2002. The daughter of the firefighter that saved her bears her name, as well as a local hotel called Pension Vesna in the Czech Republic, near the site of the crash.

See also 
 List of accidents and incidents involving airliners by airline
 List of terrorist incidents in 1972
 List of unsolved deaths
 Timeline of airliner bombing attacks

References

External links 

 Accident to Yugoslav aircraft YU-AHT on January 26, 1972 in Czech Kamenica. The blast from explosives in carry-on luggage in the front luggage compartment caused the plane crash of DC-9-30 Yugoslav Airlines flight JU 367 Stockholm – Copenhagen – Zagreb – Belgrade (Archive, PDF format, Archive) 
 Summary Report of the State Aviation Investigation Inspectorate of the causes of the accident (NA, ÚCL, karton 84, sg. 2/1972)] (Archive) 
 English summary: Analysis and conclusions (Archive) – English extract from the summary report to the International Civil Aviation Organization (NA, ÚCL, karton 83, sg. 2/1972)
 Draft interim report – the airspace at the time of the accident: report and radar images (NA, ÚCL, karton 83, sg. 2/1972) (Archive) 
 Photos of radar screen at ATC Cottbus (East Germany) (Archive) 
 Situační plán havárie letadla 1:10 000, příloha dokumentace o ohledání osobních věcí obětí. Federální ministerstvo vnitra, Odbor vyšetřování StB Ústí nad Labem (NA, ÚCL, karton 83, sg. 2/1972)( ) 
 Airliners.Net: Picture of YU-AHT
 Entry on Flight 367 at PlaneCrashInfo.com
 
 JAT 367 Memorial

Jat Airways accidents and incidents
Unsolved airliner bombings
Aviation accidents and incidents in 1972
Aviation accidents and incidents in Czechoslovakia
1972 in Czechoslovakia
Aviation accidents and incidents in Germany
1972 in Croatia
Accidents and incidents involving the McDonnell Douglas DC-9
Terrorist incidents in Europe in 1972
Mass murder in 1972
Croatian nationalist terrorism
January 1972 events in Europe
Terrorist incidents in Germany in the 1970s
Conspiracy theories involving aviation incidents
Terrorist incidents in the Czech Republic